Brackettville is a city in Kinney County, Texas, United States. The population was 1,688 at the 2010 census, down from 1,876 at the 2000 census. It is the county seat of Kinney County.

History

Founded in 1852 as "Las Moras" (the name of a nearby spring and the creek it feeds), the town initially was a supply stop on the old San Antonio-El Paso road and a supply depot for the U.S. Army's Fort Clark (the fort was established the same year). Later the town was named "Brackett" after Oscar B. Brackett, the owner of the first dry goods store in the area. In 1873, when a post office was awarded, "ville" was appended to the name to differentiate it from another town.

The town grew quickly through the 19th century with the expansion of the garrison at Fort Clark for the Indian Wars. The town's fortunes were tied to the fort. For many years, it was the base of the famous Buffalo Soldiers, made up of African Americans. Demographically, Brackettville had a larger proportion of Black Seminoles ( African American escaped slaves who had lived alongside Seminole native Americans prior to the 2nd Seminole War 1835-1842) during the S with their families in the town. During the slavery years, they had been living in a settlement in northern Mexico to escape US conditions. Their language developed in Florida, Afro-Seminole, is still spoken by some in Brackettville.

After the Buffalo Soldiers moved out of Fort Clark with the waning of the Indian Wars, it was used as a cavalry post. The Seminole Negro Indian Scouts were finally disbanded as a unit in 1914. Virtually every cavalry unit in the U.S. Army was stationed at or trained at Fort Clark at one time or another.

In 1943 during World War II, the U.S. Army activated the Second Cavalry Division, which was to be the Army's last horse-mounted unit. By 1944, even the Second had been mechanized. Fort Clark, so long a center of mounted cavalry, was targeted for closure. Before its closure, the fort was used as a German prisoner-of-war camp.

Because of the families of soldiers at the fort and African-American veterans and descendants who had settled here, during the war, the US government funded construction of a high school for black students, which opened in April 1944, so the children of veterans could be educated. The state of Texas was still racially segregated; it had essentially disenfranchised blacks since the early 20th century by its voter registration and electoral requirements, and the white legislature consistently underfunded black education and services. Officially classified as a four-year high school, it is believed to have been the only one of its kind between San Antonio and El Paso at that time.

After the fort officially closed in 1946, it had a variety of uses. In 1971 it was converted and adapted as a resort/retirement center. The historic district of the fort is listed on the National Register of Historic Places. The resort is not the economic engine the fort once was, and Brackettville has shrunk from its peak population during the war years.

Cultural matters

North of town is a tourist attraction called Alamo Village, built in the 1950s as the set of John Wayne's movie The Alamo. Scenes from the 1969 comedy Viva Max! were also shot here. As of July 2009, Alamo Village has been closed to the public. It is available for film production and special events such as weddings and receptions.

The miniseries James A. Michener's Texas (1994) was filmed in and around Brackettville. Other films shot in Brackettville include Arrowhead (1953), the John Wayne film The Alamo (1960), Two Rode Together (1961), Bandolero! (1968), Barbarosa (1982), Lonesome Dove (1989), and Bad Girls (1994).

Geography

Brackettville is located near the center of Kinney County at  (29.315349, –100.415120). It is bordered to the south by Fort Clark Springs, an unincorporated community on the site of the former Fort Clark. U.S. Route 90 runs along the southern edge of Brackettville, leading east  to Uvalde and west  to Del Rio. Texas State Highway 131 runs south from Brackettville  to Eagle Pass.

The closest airport with commercial airline service is Del Rio International Airport, on the west side of Del Rio,  from Brackettville.

Climate 
Brackettville has a humid subtropical climate (Köppen Cfa) bordering on a hot semi-arid climate (Köppen BSh) with hot summers, mild winters, and variable but moderate rainfall.

Demographics

2020 census

As of the 2020 United States census, there were 1,341 people, 568 households, and 346 families residing in the city.

2000 census
As of the census of 2000, there were 1,876 people, 618 households, and 438 families residing in the city. The population density was 591.8 people per square mile (228.5/km2). There were 766 housing units at an average density of 241.6 per square mile (93.3/km2). The racial makeup of the city was 64.77% White, 2.67% African American, 0.59% Native American, 0.05% Asian, 28.09% from other races, and 3.84% from two or more races. Hispanic or Latino of any race were 74.36% of the population. According to Ethnologue, there are 200 Afro-Seminole Creole speakers in Brackettville, which makes the town the only one in the country where this creole is still spoken.

There were 618 households, out of which 38.5% had children under the age of 18 living with them, 56.0% were married couples living together, 10.2% had a female householder with no husband present, and 29.1% were non-families. 27.3% of all households were made up of individuals, and 15.9% had someone living alone who was 65 years of age or older. The average household size was 3.00 and the average family size was 3.72.

In the city, the population was spread out, with 33.5% under the age of 18, 7.4% from 18 to 24, 24.6% from 25 to 44, 19.2% from 45 to 64, and 15.4% who were 65 years of age or older. The median age was 33 years. For every 100 females, there were 98.5 males. For every 100 females age 18 and over, there were 96.4 males.

The median income for a household in the city was $19,410, and the median income for a family was $24,063. Males had a median income of $21,806 versus $14,773 for females. The per capita income for the city was $9,332. About 31.2% of families and 33.4% of the population were below the poverty line, including 37.3% of those under age 18 and 30.2% of those age 65 or over.

Education
Brackettville is served by the Brackett Independent School District.

Climate
The climate in this area is characterized by hot, humid summers and generally mild to cool winters. According to the Köppen Climate Classification system, Brackettville has a humid subtropical climate, abbreviated "Cfa" on climate maps.

References

External links
 Official website
 The Brackett News
 San Antonio-El Paso Road

Black Seminoles
Cities in Texas
Cities in Kinney County, Texas
County seats in Texas
San Antonio–El Paso Road